The 1982 ATP Championship, also known as the Cincinnati Open, was a men's tennis tournament played on outdoor hard courts at the Lindner Family Tennis Center in Mason, Ohio in the United States that was part of the 1982 Volvo Grand Prix. The tournament was held from August 16 through August 22, 1982. Third-seeded Ivan Lendl won the singles title.

Finals

Singles
 Ivan Lendl defeated  Steve Denton 6–2, 7–6
 It was Lendl's 11th singles title of the year and the 28th of his career.

Doubles
 Peter Fleming /  John McEnroe defeated  Steve Denton /  Mark Edmondson 6–2, 6–3

References

External links
 
 ITF tournament edition details
 ATP tournament profile

Cincinnati Open
Cincinnati Masters
1982 in American tennis
Cincin